Kanwar Raaja is an Indian businessman and entrepreneur. He co-founded UFO Moviezand also the Chairman/Managing Director, Apollo International Limited, a company of Apollo Group.

He Is one of the influential personality and also recognised among the top three (3) CEO and founders of companies in India.

The Honourable Prime Minister and Finance Minister of Republic of Singapore Lee Hsien Loong presented him Global Entrepolis at Singapore Award 2007.

He was instrumental in evolving the business of digital cinema in India that gained acknowledgement from then Honorable Prime Minister of India, Dr. Manmohan Singh.

Early life

Raaja was born in 1970. His father Onkar Kanwar is a businessman and founder of Apollo Tyres, an Indian public listed company.Raaja was educated at St. Columba's School, Delhi and thereafter graduated in engineering from Drexel University, Pennsylvania, US.

Career

Raaja is the Chairman and Managing Director, Apollo LogiSolutionswhich set up a 20,000 sq ft facility in Hyderabad, for packaging boxes for temperature sensitive vaccines, pharmaceuticals and biologics and has a global network in over 100 countries.

In 2007, He was nominated for Ernst & Young Entrepreneur of the Year Award.

In 2017, He won Best Logistics CEO of the Year.

He previously held the position of Member of Young Presidents' Organization (Mumbai), Member of India Ministry of Information & Broadcasting, Chairman at Federation of Indian Chambers of Commerce & Industry, Member of International Chamber of Commerce (France) , Member The Economic Times India Leadership Council (ETILC) and Director at Valuable Media Pvt Ltd.

References

Businesspeople from Delhi
Living people
Indian billionaires
1970 births